President Kun may refer to:
 Ruben Kun (1942–2014), 6th president of Nauru
 Russ Kun (born 1975), 16th president of Nauru